Sundaram Mathura-Nayagam (24 September 1906 - 03 February 1972) was a pioneer of Sinhala cinema, producing the first ever Sinhala talkie, Kadawunu Poronduwa.

Career
Hailing from Madurai, South India, Nayagam was originally an industrialist, making soaps and perfumes at factories both in Madurai and Ceylon. With the flourishing of Indian cinema in the 1940s, he established his own cinema company, Sri Murugan Navakala Limited, named after the Hindu deity Murugan. The company was based in Madurai, owning a studio (Chitrakala Movietone) at Thiruparankundram.

Nayagam's first venture into film was the 1946 Tamil language film Kumaraguru, directed by Bengali director Jothish Sinha. His second film, a patriotic film entitled Thaai Nadu, was also in Tamil, being released on the day of India's independence.

Kadawunu Poronduwa
According to Nayagam, his Sinhala friends enjoyed Hindi and Tamil films but were disappointed that they did not have films in their own language. Nayagam was thus inspired to produce a film in the Sinhala language. After considering several storylines, he settled on a popular Sinhala stage play, going on to produce Kadawunu Poronduwa. The film was shot at his own studio, with all technicians from India but the cast brought from the island country for this purpose. The film's debut in Ceylon was attended by the head of the ministerial cabinet, D. S. Senanayake; nevertheless, the film received mixed reactions in the country. While the average filmgoer was happy to watch a film that in their own language, critics said the film was overtly “Indian” in content and form.

Filmography

References

External links 
 

Sri Lankan film producers
Film producers from Tamil Nadu
Businesspeople from Madurai
Tamil film producers
20th-century Indian businesspeople